The First Collage is the debut extended play by South Korean singer Yang Yo-seob. It was released on November 26, 2012 by Cube Entertainment and consists of five tracks including the title track "Caffeine".

Release
On November 19 idol group member Yong Jun-hyung made an announcement on Twitter of a mysterious track list but did not provide any further explanation, leading many fans to believe it as his solo project debut. The album was officially announced on November 21, 2012, titled "The First Collage", and Yong Jun-hyung will actually act as a producer for his fellow group member Yoseob. A series of MV still teasers were released in the next few days followed by the music video teaser, released November 23. To date, it has sold 53,754 copies.

Track listing

Chart performance

Album chart

Single chart

Other songs charted

Sales and certifications

References

External links
 Cube Entertainment
 

2012 debut EPs
Korean-language EPs
Cube Entertainment EPs